Feliks Malanowski (17 May 1906 – 5 April 1976) was a Polish sprinter. He competed in the men's 4 × 400 metres relay at the 1928 Summer Olympics.

References

1906 births
1976 deaths
Athletes (track and field) at the 1928 Summer Olympics
Polish male sprinters
Polish male middle-distance runners
Olympic athletes of Poland
People from Płońsk
Sportspeople from Masovian Voivodeship
20th-century Polish people